Heinke was a series of companies that made diving equipment in London, run by members of a Heinke family.

Timeline

1786: Gotthilf Frederick Heinke was born in Messeritz, Prussia.: He arrived in London in 1809 and worked initially as a victualler to build up capital 
1812: He married Sarah Smith, who bore him three sons and two daughters.
1816: John William Heinke (son of Gotthilf Frederick) born.
1818: Gotthilf Frederick Heinke opened an ironmongery shop business in London.
1818: Charles Edwin Heinke (son of Gotthilf Frederick) born.
1819: Gotthilf Frederick Heinke got a workshop at 103 Great Portland Street in London since 1819.
1820: Gotthilf Henry Heinke (son of Gotthilf Frederick) born.
1839: Gotthilf Frederick Heinke opened a second premises at 3 Old Jewry, London.
1840: John William Heinke married Louisa Margaret Leathart.

Start of making diving helmets
1844: Around then Charles Edwin Heinke made his first diving helmet. Inspired by William F. Saddler, Heinke started using solid brass for diving helmets' breastplates, instead of copper sheet. Heinke's diving helmets had three similarly-shaped circular windows. They did not have the outer protective grills as in other helmets; thus they had better visibility for divers, and it was easier to keep the windows clean. Heinke's main competitor was Siebe Gorman who also made diving helmets, and Heinke constantly tried to improve on designs. He introduced an additional exhaust valve on the front side of the breastplate, which is now called the "peppermill" because of the holes in its cover. This exhaust made it possible for the diver to ascend and descend much faster.
1845: He brought in the "Pearler" helmet, with a square-pattern mould-cast (instead of oval and beaten) copper helmet. He became famous with this style. Their square breastplate made it easier for the diver to bend forwards to look for pearl oysters on the seabed. The idea was later copied by companies such as Siebe after Siebe took over Heinke, and even by Morse Diving in the USA.
1858: Around then the addresses in Great Portland Street were renumbered: 103 became 79.
1852: Starting then, William Robert Foster and others ran a firm 'Foster and Williams' supplying diving dresses and air hose at 87 Grange Road, Bermondsey, London.
1858: Gotthilf Frederick Heinke applied for British citizenship, and was granted it.
1863: Some members of the Heinke family (including Frederick William Heinke (son of John William Heinke) started a firm "Heinke Brothers", 78-78 Great Portland Street, London, "Submarine Engineers"; that firm lasted until 1867.
1869: Charles Edwin Heinke died after being in ill-health for 2–3 years 
1870: John William Heinke died from congestion of the liver after an 11-month illness. These two deaths disorganized company business.
1871: Frederick William Heinke and one William Griffin Davis AICE formed a new firm 'Heinke & Davis' at 176 Great Portland Street, London. It moved to 2 Brabant Court, Philpot Lane, London. It was bankrupt by January 1879.
1871: Gotthilf Frederick Heinke died 
1871: Gotthilf Henry Heinke became a sleeping partner in the business and took on a partner William Foster to manage the business; they started a new business 'C.E.Heinke & Co, Submarine Engineers'.
1880: Frederick William Heinke was forced to seek work in North America, but died of a fever in 1883 in Tecomabaca, Oaxaca, Mexico.
1884: Gotthilf Henry Heinke retired for ill health, and sold his company to William Foster and Robert Fox (his brother in law) who had also become involved in the business, but continued to live on the upper floor of 79 Great Portland Street till his death in 1899

20th century
1902: Robert Fox died. 'Foster and Williams' was merged into 'C.E.Heinke & Co, Submarine Engineers'.
1904: The lease on Great Portland Street expired. Production was moved to Foster and Williams's premises.
1905: The company got 10,000 more square feet of work area.
1905: All Heinke helmets made until 1905 had the butterfly style wingnuts; after that regular wingnuts were used.
1922: C.E.Heinke & Co, Submarine Engineers became a limited company 'C.E.Heinke & Co Ltd, Submarine Engineers', making a good living from standard diving equipment.

WWII and after
WWII blitz: Many company records were lost.
1950: After this date the firm's fortunes declined, as with Siebe Gorman.
Mid to late 1950s: the firm starts making "Heinke-Lung" aqualungs, Delta dry suits, Dolphin and Falla wetsuits, Hans Hass diving masks, swimming fins and snorkel tubes.
1958: Heinke donated the Heinke Trophy to the British Sub-Aqua Club (BSAC). This trophy is awarded annually to the BSAC branch judged to have done the most to further the interests of its own members and of the BSAC.
1961: The firm was incorporated into Siebe Gorman. The last Heinke diving helmet went out of production in 1961. A few helmets were given the tag of "Siebe-Heinke", but eventually the name Heinke completely disappeared.
1967-1968: Siebe Gorman stops using the tradename 'Siebe Heinke'.
Unlike Siebe Gorman, who had only one series of serial numbers for their diving helmets, except for the last productions (which were meant most probably for the Russian Navy), Heinke used many series of serial numbers for them.

Recent discovery:
A fisher in southern sea of Myanmar recently claimed discovery a right side of diving shoe labeled G. F. Heinke 42 ft deep in the sea, early September of 2022. It weighs about 5 kgs and is 13 ft long.

References

External links
Heinke
C.E.Heinke
The Heinke Trophy Award
Link to early 1950s advertisement for a Heinke-Lung (aqualung made by Heinke
Similar with Hans Hass and Lotte Hass
Heinke Lungs
Heinke Dolphin Wetsuit
Heinke Delta Dry Suit
Heinke Falla Wetsuit

Diving equipment manufacturers
Diving engineering
Defunct companies of the United Kingdom
Manufacturing companies based in London
Underwater diving in the United Kingdom